Mack & Rita is a 2022 American comedy film directed by Katie Aselton, from a screenplay by Madeline Walter and Paul Welsh. The plot follows a 30-year-old woman (Elizabeth Lail) who wakes up as her 70-year-old self (Diane Keaton) after a bachelorette party. Taylour Paige, Loretta Devine, Amy Hill, Lois Smith, Wendie Malick, Simon Rex, Martin Short, and Dustin Milligan also star. The film was released on August 12, 2022, by Gravitas Premiere, to negative reviews from critics, including a worst actress nomination for Keaton, but the performances of Paige and Milligan were praised.

Premise
Thirty-year-old Mack Martin reluctantly joins a Palm Springs bachelorette trip for her best friend Carla, but then decides not to go to the event. Instead she finds a tent and does a past life regression and winds up as her seventy-year-old self. Freed from the constraints of other people's expectations, Rita comes into her own, becoming an unlikely social media sensation, and sparks a tentative romance with Mack's dog-sitter, Jack.

Cast

Production
The film initially began development in January 2020, but fell apart amid the start of the COVID-19 pandemic. That October, producer Alex Saks approached director Katie Aselton saying he had secured about $500,000 of funding. In March 2021, it was announced Diane Keaton, Elizabeth Lail, Taylour Paige, Dustin Milligan, Simon Rex, Nicole Byer, Patti Harrison, Loretta Devine, Wendie Malick, Lois Smith and Amy Hill had joined the cast of the film, with a screenplay by Madeline Walter and Paul Welsh. Shortly after, it was reported that Elizabeth Lail joined to the cast.

Principal photography began on March 25, 2021 and concluded on April 23, 2021 in Los Angeles, California. Due to a limited production budget and the ongoing pandemic, several changes had to be made to the script during shooting, including the forced removal of a Coachella sequence due to the event's cancellation and combining days of shooting into one, as well as not being able to have chemistry tests between the actors prior to filming.

Release
In April 2022, Gravitas Premiere acquired distribution rights to the film, and set it for an August 12, 2022, release. The red carpet took place at the NeueHouse in Los Angeles, California in August 10, 2022.

Reception

Box office 
The film made $310,000 from 1,930 theaters on its first day. It went on to debut to $1.1 million.

Critical response 
On Rotten Tomatoes, it holds a 25% approval rating based on 62 critics, with an average score of 4.2/10. The site's critics consensus reads: "Diane Keaton gives Mack & Rita her all, but this cloying comedy lets her down at nearly every turn." Metacritic assigned the film a weighted average score of 49 out of 100, based on 13 critics, indicating "mixed or average reviews". Audiences polled by CinemaScore gave the film an average grade of "D+" on an A+ to F scale, while PostTrak gave the film a 61% overall positive score, with 46% saying they would definitely recommend it.

Lisa Kennedy of The New York Times commended Aselton's "unexpected beats" as a director for capturing the "esprit de girlfriends" quality of Insecure, despite borrowing from Nancy Meyers' "rom-com catalog of upscale homes." Nell Minow, writing for RogerEbert.com, gave credit to Paige and Milligan's performances but wrote that "[T]he film's promising setup and excellent cast are let down by a script so forgettable that even to try to summarize it is to feel it dissolve from memory." Katie Walsh of the Los Angeles Times was also critical of the film's script, saying it "ditches character establishment and clear conflict for fish-out-of-water physical comedy and some vaguely affirmative lessons about learning to be yourself, unapologetically." The A.V. Clubs Courtney Howard and Entertainment Weeklys Leah Greenblatt both gave the movie an overall C+ grade, the former saying it followed the same "whimsical fantasy boilerplate" of the body-swap subgenre with similar themes of "confidence, regret and friendship" and the latter calling it "a body-swap comedy so daffy and weightless it nearly levitates." Amy Nicholson of Variety called it "a bewildering generational culture-war comedy", criticizing the mixed messages on agism and the "underwritten" roles given to the supporting cast.

References

External links
 Official website
 

2022 films
2020s American films
2020s English-language films
2020s female buddy films
American romantic comedy films
Films about social media
Films directed by Katie Aselton
Films set in Palm Springs, California
Films shot in Los Angeles
English-language romantic comedy films